Statistics of Austrian Football Bundesliga in the 1996–97 season.

Overview
It was contested by 10 teams, and SV Austria Salzburg won the championship.

Teams and location

Teams of 1996–97 Austrian Football Bundesliga
FC Admira/Wacker
Austria Salzburg
Austria Wien
Grazer AK
LASK
FC Linz
Rapid Wien
SV Ried
Sturm Graz
Tirol Innsbruck

League standings

Results
Teams played each other four times in the league. In the first half of the season each team played every other team twice (home and away), and then did the same in the second half of the season.

First half of season

Second half of season

Relegation play-offs

|}

Top goalscorers

References
Austria - List of final tables (RSSSF)

Austrian Football Bundesliga seasons
Aust
1996–97 in Austrian football